Lagana may refer to:

 Lagana (bread), a Greek flatbread baked for Clean Monday
 Tracta (dough) or lagana, an ancient pastry dough from Greek and Roman cuisine
 Laganas, seaside resort on the Greek island of Zakynthos
 Dan Lagana, American television writer
 Frankie Lagana (1985–), Australian soccer player
 Joseph Lagana (1978–), American politician
 Sergio Lagana (born 1982). Italian professional road cyclist